Miʼkal is an ancient village and a historical neighborhood that is a subject of Baladiyah al-Batha in southern Riyadh, Saudi Arabia, located between ad-Dubiyah and al-Wusaita. The town came into existence when Hajr al-Yamamah disintegrated up into several settlements and estates in the 16th century (10 AH), the most notable of them being Migrin (or Muqrin) and Mi'kal. Its name reportedly comes from two pre-Islamic Arabian deities, Kāl and Miʿkāl that were worshipped in Najd.

History 
The town came into existence when Hajr al-Yamamah disintegrated up into several settlements and estates in the 16th century (10 AH), the most notable of them being Migrin (or Muqrin) and Mi'kal. It was reportedly named after two pre-Islamic Arabian deities, Kāl and Miʿkāl that were worshipped in Najd.

According to historian Abd al-Malik ibn Husayn al-Isami al-Makki, Mikal was also the site of a military conflict when it was besieged in 1578 (986 AH) by 50 soldiers of the Sharif of Mecca Abu Numayy II in which he killed several of its political leaders and imprisoned others for almost a year until they agreed to pay concessions.

References 

Riyadh